Marta Alicia Martin (born September 10, 1966) is an American television and film actress.

Personal life
Martin was born in Medina, Ohio. She is of partial Mexican heritage on her mother's side. She is one of four children. She relocated to California at the age of 19.

Work
In 1987, Martin came to Los Angeles on a Greyhound bus with $500. After a series of odd jobs, she landed her first film role (performing under the name “Marta Alica”) in the film Mindwarp co-starring Bruce Campbell. Her roommate during her first years in Los Angeles was soap opera and CSI: Miami star Eva LaRue. They remain best friends to this day.

Martin spent much of the 1990s guest-starring in a variety of network sitcoms and dramas, including NYPD Blue, Dharma & Greg, Players, and Ned & Stacey. She was part of the original cast of the ABC drama Brothers & Sisters, before the cast was overhauled prior to premiering.

Her most recent television work was the 2007 Lifetime movie Christmas in Paradise co-starring Eureka star Colin Ferguson. She co-starred in the 2009 film release Skills Like This which won the Audience Award at the 2007 SXSW Film Festival.

Filmography
Star Trek (2009)
Christmas in Paradise (2007)
Shark (1 episode, 2007)
Skills Like This (2007)
Eyes (1 episode, 2007)
Brothers & Sisters (1 episode, unaired pilot 2007)
CSI: Miami (1 episode, 2004)
CSI: NY (1 episode, 2004)
Without a Trace (1 episode, 2003)
CSI: Crime Scene Investigation (1 episode, 2002)
City of Angels (1 episode, 2000)
Any Day Now (1 episode, 1999)
NYPD Blue (2 episodes, 1994–1999)
Dharma & Greg (1 episode, 1998)
Team Knight Rider (2 episodes, 1998)
Players (2 episodes, 1997)
Diagnosis Murder (1 episode, 1997)
Silk Stalkings (1 episode, 1996)
JAG (1 episode, 1995)
Ned & Stacey (2 episodes, 1995)
Body Chemistry 4: Full Exposure (1995)
Murder, She Wrote (1 episode, 1995)
Danger Theatre (1 episode, 1993)
Mindwarp (1992)
Monday Morning (1990)

External links
 Official Marta Martin site
 

Actresses from Ohio
American actresses of Mexican descent
Living people
1966 births
People from Medina, Ohio
21st-century American women